Rose Hopewell-Fong is a Hong Kong rugby union player. She represented Hong Kong when they made their World Cup debut in 2017 in Ireland.

Biography 
Hopewell-Fong has represented Hong Kong in fifteens and sevens. She has a Master's degree in International Education from the University of Sunderland. In 2015 She retired from playing sevens rugby.

References 

Living people
Hong Kong people
Hong Kong rugby union players
Hong Kong female rugby union players
Hong Kong female rugby sevens players
Year of birth missing (living people)
Rugby union players at the 2014 Asian Games